Soros Realism is a term coined by Miško Šuvaković in "Ideologija izložbe: o ideologijama Manifeste" (2002) describing a type of post-socialist art financed by American Businessman of Hungarian origin George Soros, who has financed number of Soros centers for contemporary art the Eastern Europe.

Although it was not originally used pejoratively by Šuvaković, because of its reverberation of the very name of Socialistic Realism, a style of socialist propaganda in painting and sculpture, it has staid an irony of a renewed political funding of art, that censors by financing not forbidding.

References 
Miško Šuvaković (January 2002) Ideologija izložbe: o ideologijama Manifeste. Platforma 2 Volume,  DOI:
Ana Peraica(2006). "Ein Wandel in der Repräsentation des Arbeiters Vom Sozialistischen Realismus zum »Soros-Realismus« (A shift of representation of worker: From Social Realism and "Soros Realism"). ." Springerin Hefte fűr Gegenwartskunst 12(3): 30–32.

Political art
George Soros